Return of the Trill is the fifth studio album by American rapper Bun B. The album was released on August 31, 2018 by 2 Trill Enterprises, Double Dose Entertainment and EMPIRE Distribution. The album features guest appearances from Big K.R.I.T., Lil Wayne, T.I., Pimp C, Yo Gotti, 2 Chainz, Lil' Keke, Slim Thug, Run the Jewels, Gary Clark Jr., Giggs, 8Ball and MJG and Leon Bridges.

Track listing

Personnel
Angela "Queenie" Freeman – executive production
Big K.R.I.T. – executive production, production 
Bun B – co-executive production
Anzel Jennings – co-executive production
Micah Wyatt – engineering, mixing
Oktober1st – engineering
Chemist – engineering

Musicians

Gary Clark Jr. – lead guitar 
Classik Mussik – additional vocals 
Dee-Rick – additional vocals 
Yung Huey – additional vocals 

Production and arrangement

Big E – production 
El-P – production 
Oktober1st – production 
Beat King – production 
B. Barber – production 
Corey Mo – production

Charts

References

2018 albums
Bun B albums
Albums produced by El-P
Albums produced by Big K.R.I.T.
Sequel albums